The Morris CDSW 6x4 was a six-wheeled artillery tractor brought into service in the early to mid-1930s by the British Army to tow its field guns.

Typically it was used to pull the 18-pounder field gun and the 4.5-inch howitzer, and later the 25-pounder gun-howitzer which replaced those two weapons. It was also used, with a modified body, for hauling the  40mm Bofors in the Light Anti-Aircraft (LAA) regiments. A version equipped with a crane was used for "breakdown" work. It was for the large part replaced in its primary role towing the 25 pdrs by the Morris C8 "Quad".

CDSW indicated model "C", Double Axle rear "D", Six Cylinder Engine "S" and Winch "W".

Gallery

References

C8
Military trucks of the United Kingdom
Artillery tractors
Soft-skinned vehicles
Military vehicles introduced in the 1930s
Vehicles introduced in 1933
World War II vehicles of the United Kingdom